Mordellistena mediogemellata is a species of beetle in the family Mordellidae which is in the superfamily Tenebrionoidea. It was discovered in 1977 and can be found in Hungary and the European part of Turkey.

References

mediogemellata
Beetles described in 1977
Beetles of Europe